Eighteen Years Old (Osmnáctiletá) is a 1939 Czechoslovak drama film, directed by Miroslav Cikán. It stars  Hana Vítová, Bolek Prchal, and Ladislav Boháč.

References

External links
Eighteen Years Old (Osmnáctiletá) at the Internet Movie Database

1939 films
Czechoslovak drama films
1939 drama films
Films directed by Miroslav Cikán
Czechoslovak black-and-white films
1930s Czech films